= Joris Dormans =

Dutch game developer

- Occupation: Professor of Game Design
- Known for: Game mechanics and design, procedural content generation

Joris Dormans is an assistant professor at the Leiden University Centre for the Arts in Society: and author on game development. He is the co-founder of Ludomotion and game design tool Machinations and is best known for his research in procedural content generation, formal tools and methods to design game mechanics.

== Education ==
Dormans studied at the Faculty of Architecture at University of Eindhoven from 1993 to 1996. He completed his MA studies in Comparative Art Studies at the Free University of Amsterdam from 1997 to 2003. He obtained his PhD in Game Design from the University of Amsterdam in 2012.

== Career ==
Dormans began his career as a freelancer game designer in 2004. In 2012, he co-founded indie game studio Ludomotion, where to date he serves as Game Director. In 2018, he was one of the co-founders of Machinations, a browser-based platform to simulate game systems.

== Selected publications ==
- Dormans, Joris (2010-06-18). "Adventures in level design". Proceedings of the 2010 Workshop on Procedural Content Generation in Games. PCGames '10. Monterey, California: Association for Computing Machinery. pp. 1–8. doi:10.1145/1814256.1814257. ISBN 978-1-4503-0023-0. S2CID 207179808.
- Dormans, Joris; Bakkes, Sander (September 2011). "Generating Missions and Spaces for Adaptable Play Experiences". IEEE Transactions on Computational Intelligence and AI in Games. 3 (3): 216–228. Bibcode:2011ITCIA...3..216D. doi:10.1109/TCIAIG.2011.2149523. ISSN 1943-0698. S2CID 16064762.
- Dormans, Joris (2011-06-28). "Level design as model transformation". Proceedings of the 2nd International Workshop on Procedural Content Generation in Games. PCGames '11. Bordeaux, France: Association for Computing Machinery. pp. 1–8. doi:10.1145/2000919.2000921. ISBN 978-1-4503-0872-4. S2CID 18119686.
- Dormans, Joris (December 2006). "On the Role of the Die: A brief ludologic study of pen-and-paper roleplaying games and their rules". Game Studies. 6 (1). ISSN 1604-7982.

== Published books ==
- Adams, Ernest; Dormans, Joris (2012). Game mechanics : advanced game design. Berkeley, Calif.: New Riders. ISBN 978-0-13-294668-1. OCLC 808118806.
- Dormans, Joris (2012). Engineering emergence : applied theory for game design. Universiteit van Amsterdam [Host]. ISBN 978-94-6190-752-3. OCLC 773444448.
